Asprilla is a surname of Spanish origin and may refer to:

 Avelino Asprilla (born 1981), Panamanian baseballer
 Carlos Asprilla (born 1970), Colombian football player 
 Chamell Asprilla (born 1998), Panamanian footballer 
 Dairon Asprilla (born 1992), Colombian footballer 
 Danilo Moreno Asprilla (1989), Colombian footballer 
 Faustino Asprilla (born 1969), Colombian footballer
 Jimmy Asprilla (born 1980), Colombian footballer 
 Leidy Asprilla (1997–2019), Colombian footballer
 Leonidas Asprilla (born 1952), Colombian boxer
 Lewis Asprilla (born 1972), Colombian long-jumper
 Luis Asprilla (born 1977), Colombian footballer
 Luis Carlos Asprilla (born 1977), Colombian footballer
 Nestor Asprilla (born 1986), Colombian footballer
 Yáser_Asprilla (born 2003), football player
 Yuber Asprilla (born 1992), football player

See also
 Asprilla (footballer, born 1981) (born Cristiano Luís Rodrigues in 1981), Brazilian footballer
 Óscar Díaz (Colombian footballer), (born Óscar Díaz Asprilla in 1972), Colombian footballer